Otto Borgström (4 April 1895 – 20 September 1962) was a Swedish wrestler. He competed at the 1920 and 1924 Summer Olympics.

References

External links
 

1895 births
1962 deaths
Olympic wrestlers of Sweden
Wrestlers at the 1920 Summer Olympics
Wrestlers at the 1924 Summer Olympics
Swedish male sport wrestlers
Sportspeople from Malmö